The France women's youth national handball team is the national under–17 Handball team of the France. Controlled by the French Handball Federation it represents the country in international matches. Winner of European Youth Olympic Festival in 2019.

History

Youth Olympic Games 

 Champions   Runners up   Third place   Fourth place

IHF World Championship 

 Champions   Runners up   Third place   Fourth place

European Championship 
 Champions   Runners up   Third place   Fourth place

References

External links 
Official website of the French Handball Federation  

Handball in France
Women's national youth handball teams
Handball